Allison Beveridge (born 1 June 1993) is a Canadian professional racing cyclist, who most recently rode for UCI Women's Continental Team . She rode at the 2015 UCI Track Cycling World Championships, winning bronze medals in the team pursuit and the scratch race. In April 2021, she qualified to represent Canada at the 2020 Summer Olympics.

Major results
2013
 1st Team pursuit, Los Angeles Grand Prix (with Laura Brown, Gillian Carleton, Jasmin Glaesser and Stephanie Roorda)
2014
 2nd Team pursuit, UCI Track World Championships
2015
 1st  Team pursuit, Pan American Games (with Laura Brown, Jasmin Glaesser and Kirsti Lay)
 Milton International Challenge
1st Team pursuit (with Laura Brown, Jasmin Glaesser and Kirsti Lay)
3rd Omnium
 Pan American Track Championships
2nd Omnium
2nd Scratch
2nd Team pursuit (with Annie Foreman-Mackey, Kirsti Lay and Stephanie Roorda)
 UCI Track World Championships
3rd Scratch
3rd Team pursuit
2016
 2nd Team pursuit, UCI Track World Championships
 3rd Team pursuit, Olympic Games
2017
 1st  Road race, National Road Championships
 2nd  Team pursuit, 2017–18 UCI Track World Cup, Pruszków (with Ariane Bonhomme, Annie Foreman-Mackey and Kinley Gibson)
2018
 3rd Team pursuit, Commonwealth Games

References

External links

1993 births
Living people
Canadian female cyclists
Sportspeople from Calgary
Cyclists at the 2015 Pan American Games
Pan American Games gold medalists for Canada
Pan American Games bronze medalists for Canada
Olympic cyclists of Canada
Olympic bronze medalists for Canada
Cyclists at the 2016 Summer Olympics
Medalists at the 2016 Summer Olympics
Olympic medalists in cycling
Pan American Games medalists in cycling
Cyclists at the 2018 Commonwealth Games
Commonwealth Games medallists in cycling
Commonwealth Games bronze medallists for Canada
Medalists at the 2015 Pan American Games
Cyclists at the 2020 Summer Olympics
Medallists at the 2018 Commonwealth Games